Providence St. Joseph Health is a not-for-profit health care system operating in seven states and serves as the parent organization for 100,000 caregivers. The combined system includes 51 hospitals, 829 physician clinics, and other health, education and social services across Washington, Oregon, California, Alaska, Montana, New Mexico, and Texas.

History 
In 2016, Providence Health & Services, based in Renton, Washington, and St. Joseph Health, based in Irvine, California, merged to created Providence St. Joseph Health.

Providence Health & Services 
In 2012, Providence acquired Swedish Health Services in Seattle, Washington, to expand services to patients in Snohomish and King counties.

Rod Hochman, CEO of Swedish Medical Center was hired by Providence Health & Services when Providence affiliated with Swedish in 2012. In April 2013, Hochman became the president and CEO of Providence.

Providence entered a similar partnership with Pacific Medical Centers in 2014, which joined Swedish as part of Providence's Western HealthConnect division.

Providence St. Joseph Health 
After nearly a year of talks, Providence Health & Services and St. Joseph Health merged in 2016, under the leadership of president and CEO Rod Hochman. On the first day following the merge, the medical group announced a new commitment to addressing mental health challenges in the nation.

In September 2019, the company announced plans to rebrand its assets under the Providence brand.

In January 2020, the company acquired Health Management Resources from Merck & Co., Inc.

Also in January 2020, Providence St. Joseph was the first US hospital chain to treat a patient with COVID-19 in Washington state.

Controversies 
In 2020 a Portland, Oregon area medical professional was allegedly fired from Providence St. Joseph Health for objecting to certain medical procedures on the grounds of her Catholic faith, namely for refusing to sign a document agreeing to refer patients for procedures such as such as tubal ligations and abortions.

References

External links 

Hospital networks in the United States
2016 establishments in the United States
Organizations established in 2016
Providence Health & Services
Catholic hospital networks in the United States